John Wandesford, 1st Earl Wandesford  (24 May 1725 – 12 January 1784) was an Anglo-Irish peer.

Wandesford was the son of George Wandesford, 4th Viscount Castlecomer and Susannah Griffith, daughter of Reverend John Griffith and Susannah Cross, and great-granddaughter of Edward Worth, Bishop of Killaloe. He succeeded to his father's viscountcy on 25 June 1751, and took his seat in the Irish House of Lords on 22 November that same year. He was elevated on 1 August 1758 when he was created Earl Wandesford in the Peerage of Ireland.

He was elected a Fellow of the Royal Society on 4 April 1774.

He married Agnes Elizabeth Southwell, daughter of John Southwell of Enniscourt, County Limerick and Sarah Rose, daughter of Henry Rose, justice of the Court of King's Bench (Ireland), on 11 August 1750. Together they had a son and a daughter. His son predeceased him, and Wandesford's titles became extinct upon his death. His daughter Frances married John Butler, 17th Earl of Ormonde.

References

1725 births
1784 deaths
Earls in the Peerage of Ireland
18th-century Irish people
Fellows of the Royal Society
Mayors of Kilkenny